A Sivathanu Pillai is an Indian scientist who formerly served as Honorary Distinguished Professor at Indian Space Research Organisation (2015-2018) and an honorary professor at IIT Delhi in the Department of Mechanical Engineering (2015-2016) and a Visiting Professor at Indian Institute of Science (2014-2015).

He is the President of Project Management Associates and is the former chairperson of the board of governors of the National Institute of Technology, Kurukshetra.

He formerly served as Chief Controller of Research and Development from year 1996 to 2014 and held the rank of "Distinguished Scientist" from year 1999 to 2014 at the Defence Research and Development Organisation at the Ministry of Defence of the Republic of India. He is also the founder-CEO and managing director of the BrahMos Aerospace Private Limited.

He also previously served as Vice President of International Project Management Association and as Special Secretary representing India in the India-Russia Inter-Governmental Commission on Military-Technical Cooperation.

Early life and education
Apathukatha Sivathanu Pillai was born in Nagercoil in Kanyakumari District, Tamilnadu on 15 July 1947. He completed his schooling at D.V.D. Higher Secondary School, Nagercoil,. He earned his Bachelor of Electrical Engineering from Thiagarajar College of Engineering in 1969.

In 1991, he attended the six-week Advanced Management Program at Harvard Business School. He then earned PhD in Technology Management from Savitribai Phule Pune University in 1996. Pillai is a close and personal friend of Former President of India APJ Abdul Kalam

Career

Academia
Pillai currently serves as Honorary Distinguished Professor at Indian Space Research Organisation and an honorary professor at IIT Delhi in the Department of Mechanical Engineering and a Visiting Professor at Indian Institute of Science.

He also formerly served as the chairperson of the Board of Governors of the National Institute of Technology, Kurukshetra.

ISRO and DRDO
Pillai joined the Defence Research and Development Service and has four decades of experience in ISRO and DRDO and has worked with Vikram Sarabhai, Satish Dhawan and APJ Abdul Kalam.

He joined DRDO in 1986 and was the Programme Director of IGMDP under the leadership of A. P. J. Kalam. He contributed to the successful development of SLV III as a core team member and to the evolution of PSLV configuration for ISRO.

Brahmos Aerospace
In August 2007 he was given a third extension of his retirement date by the Appointments Committee of the Cabinet.

Pillai is regarded as the Father of BRAHMOS, the joint venture between India and Russia to design, develop, produce and market the supersonic cruise missile BrahMos and he is the chief executive and managing director of BrahMos Aerospace. In 2007, under his leadership as CEO of Brahmos Aerospace, the company bought Kerala Hitech Industries Limited. It has been then converted into Brahmos Aerospace Trivandrum Limited, the second missile making unit of BrahMos Aerospace Private Limited for a world-class missile facility with system integration and testing.

Awards and honours

Books, research papers and journals
Sivathanu Pillai is a published author and coauthor of several books, research papers and journals.

References

Further reading

External links
 Official Website
 
 
 Pillars of BrahMos

Others
 India primes for growth in defence electronics
 
 Tipu Sultan the first to use missile technology
 Humans will soon inhabit other planets: Sivathanu Pillai
 Hypersonic missiles to replace ballistic missiles
 India should have its own computer operating system: Pillai
 Nanotechnology will change lives: Sivathanu Pillai

Living people
1947 births
Tamil scientists
Scientists from Tamil Nadu
People from Kanyakumari district
Savitribai Phule Pune University alumni
Academic staff of IIT Delhi
Academic staff of the Indian Institute of Science
Indian Space Research Organisation people
Indian chief executives
People from Nagercoil
Defence Research and Development Organisation
English-language writers from India
Recipients of the Padma Shri in science & engineering
Recipients of the Padma Bhushan in science & engineering
20th-century Indian engineers
Indian electrical engineers
Engineers from Tamil Nadu
Businesspeople from Tamil Nadu